Oudri's fan-footed gecko (Ptyodactylus oudrii), also known commonly as the Algerian fan-fingered gecko and Oudri's fan-fingered gecko, is a species of lizard in the family Phyllodactylidae. The species is endemic to the Maghreb region of northwestern Africa.

Etymology
The specific name, oudrii, is in honor of General Émile Oudri (1843–1919) of the French Foreign Legion.

Geographic range
P. oudrii is found in Algeria and Morocco.

Habitat
The natural habitats of P. oudrii are subtropical or tropical dry shrubland and rocky areas.

Reproduction
P. oudrii is oviparous.

References

Further reading
Heimes P (1987). "Beitrag zur Systematik der Fächerfinger (Sauria: Gekkonidae: Ptyodactylus)". Salamandra 23 (4): 212–235. (in German, with an abstract in English).
Lataste F (1880). "Diagnoses de reptiles nouveaux d'Algérie ". Le Naturaliste 1: 299, 306–307. (Ptyodactylus oudrii, new species, p. 299). (in French).
Sindaco R, Jeremčenko VK (2008). The Reptiles of the Western Palearctic. 1. Annotated Checklist and Distributional Atlas of the Turtles, Crocodiles, Amphisbaenians and Lizards of Europe, North Africa, Middle East and Central Asia. (Monographs of the Societas Herpetologica Italica). Latina, Italy: Edizioni Belvedere. 580 pp. . 
Trape J-F, Trape S, Chirio L (2012). Lézards, crocodiles et tortues d'Afrique occidentale et du Sahara. Paris: IRD Orstom. 503 pp. . (in French).

Ptyodactylus
Reptiles described in 1880
Taxonomy articles created by Polbot